I'll Help You Forget Her is a studio album by American country music artist Dottie West. It was released in November 1967 on RCA Victor and was produced by Chet Atkins. West's seventh studio effort, I'll Help You Forget Her was also her fourth studio offering in 1967. It included the single "Like a Fool", which became a major hit. The album itself would reach peak positions on national publication charts.

Background and content
I'll Help You Forget Her was recorded in March 1967 at RCA Studio B, located in Nashville, Tennessee. The sessions were produced by Chet Atkins. Atkins was responsible for producing West's six studio offerings with the RCA Victor label. He also was responsible for originally signing her to a recording contract in 1963. Atkins incorporated the Nashville Sound sub-genre of country music onto West's 1960s albums, including I'll Help You Forget Her. He accompanied her vocal styling with the Nashville's Sound pop-sound arrangement to create her own unique sound.

The collection consisted of 12 tracks. Two of the tracks had been composed by West and her husband, Bill. Her husband is also featured playing steel guitar on the record. Several tracks on the record were arranged by country artist Ray Stevens. Stevens had also been a featured arranger on West's previous album releases for RCA. Stevens' arrangement credits include the title track, "Like a Fool" and "Give Him My Love". The album also included songs previously made successful by other artists. Among these songs was a cover of George Jones' "Walk Through This World with Me", Jack Greene's "There Goes My Everything" and Don Gibson's "(I'd Be A) Legend in My Time".

Release and reception
I'll Help You Forget Her was released in November 1967 on RCA Victor Records. It became West's fourth studio offering in 1967 and seventh studio offering altogether. It was originally issued as a vinyl LP, featuring six songs on each side of the record. In the 2010s, the album was released digitally to retailers. The album spent 18 weeks on the Billboard Top Country Albums chart before peaking at number 11 in March 1968. It became West's fifth studio release to reach the Billboard charts. I'll Help You Forget Her included one single release. The track, "Like a Fool", was issued as a single in July 1967. The song became a major hit in 1967, reaching number 13 on the Billboard Hot Country Singles chart in October 1967.

Track listing

Original LP version

Digital version

Personnel
All credits are adapted from the liner notes of I'll Help You Forget Her.

Musical personnel
 Harold Bradley – guitar
 Floyd Cramer – piano
 Ray Edenton – guitar
 Buddy Harman – drums
 Roy Huskey – bass
 The Jordanaires – background vocals
 Grady Martin – guitar
 Charlie McCoy – harmonica, vibes
 Bob Moore – bass
 Wayne Moss – guitar
 Bill West – steel guitar
 Dottie West – lead vocals

Technical personnel
 Chet Atkins – producer
 Jim Malloy – engineering
 Ray Stevens – arrangement

Chart performance

Release history

References

 

1967 albums
Albums arranged by Ray Stevens
Albums produced by Chet Atkins
Dottie West albums
RCA Records albums